Wyoming Highway 170 (WYO 170) is a  Wyoming state road located in central Hot Springs County. WYO 170 is predominantly an east–west highway, although it travels southeast to northwest for its last 5 miles.

Route description
Wyoming Highway 170 begins its northwestern end in an area called Hamilton Dome within the census-designated place of Owl Creek at Hot Springs CR 15. Via CR 15 (Hamilton Dome Road) and CR 10 (Cottonwood Creek Road) one can return to Wyoming Highway 120.

Highway 170 travels southeasterly from Hamilton Dome, locally named Hamilton Dome Road, and meets the eastern terminus of Wyoming Highway 174 approximately 5.5 miles south of Hamilton Dome. Here WYO 170 turns east and is named Owl Creek Road. WYO 170 will continue east for the remainder of its routing as it parallels Owl Creek along north edge of Wind River Indian Reservation. Highway 170 reaches Wyoming Highway 120 at 15.41 miles and ends, eight miles northwest of Thermopolis.

Major intersections

References

External links 

Wyoming State Routes 100-199
WYO 170 - WYO 120 to WYO 174
WYO 170 - WYO 174 to Hamilton Dome

Transportation in Hot Springs County, Wyoming
170